Vardan Mamikonian (– 451) was an Armenian military leader who led a rebellion against Sasanian Iran in 450–451. Vardan and most of his comrades died at the Battle of Avarayr in 451, but their sacrifice was immortalized in the works of the Armenian historians Yeghishe and Ghazar Parpetsi. He is regarded as a national hero among Armenians and venerated as a martyr and a saint of the Armenian Church. Vardan and the rebellion he led are commemorated in numerous works of art and literature. According to Arshag Chobanian, "To the Armenian nation, Vartan [...] is the most beloved figure, the most sacred in their history, the symbolical hero who typifies the national spirit."

Biography
Vardan Mamikonian was born in approximately 387 in the settlement of Ashtishat in the Taron region to Hamazasp Mamikonian and Sahakanoysh, daughter of Patriarch Sahak of Armenia. He had two younger brothers, Hamazasp and Hmayeak. He was educated in Vagharshapat at the school founded by Patriarch Sahak and Mesrop Mashtots. After the death of his father, he became the head of the Mamikonian noble family. In 420, he went to Constantinople with Mesrop Mashtots and was appointed stratelates (general) of Byzantine Armenia by Theodosius II. Vardan retained this title after the abolition of the Kingdom of Armenia in 428.

Conditions worsened in Sasanian Armenia with the accession of Yazdegerd II in 439. At first, Yazdegerd and his officials imposed heavier taxes and obligations on Armenia and its nobility, but did not yet openly move against the Armenian Church. In 442, Yazdegerd sent the Armenian cavalry commanded by Vardan east to fight the Huns. In 449, the Sasanian king issued an edict officially imposing Zoroastrianism on Armenia. That same year, the Armenian elite gathered at Artaxata under the presidency of marzpan Vasak Siwni, Vardan, the bidaxsh of the Iberia March, and the acting Catholicos of Armenia to declare their loyalty to the Sasanian state and their Christian faith. Yazdegerd did not accept this decision and summoned the Armenian magnates to Ctesiphon and forced them to convert to Zoroastrianism. Yazdegerd released most of the nobles after an unexpected attack from the east and sent magi to convert Armenia.

Upon their return to Armenia, Vardan and most of the Armenian nobles repudiated their conversion, although Yeghishe and Ghazar Parpetsi give conflicting accounts of Vardan's initial apostasy and the origins of the Armenian rebellion that broke out in 450. Vardan may have initially intended to retire into exile, but soon emerged as the leader the popular rebellion against the imposition of Zoroastrianism. Vardan and his allies made a solemn oath and captured a number of fortresses and settlements. Vardan's forces won a major victory over the Persians in the summer of 450 and secured an alliance with the northern Huns; however, an embassy to Byzantium asking for aid was unsuccessful. Vardan was opposed by a significant pro-Persian party of Armenian nobles, and marzpan Vasak Siwni refused to follow him out of Armenia to meet the Persians in battle.

In the summer of 451, a large Sasanian army including the elite cavalry corps of the Immortals and war elephants marched against the Armenian rebels. Vardan's army battled with the Persians at Avarayr near Maku on June 2. The supporters of Vasak Siwni deserted during the battle and Vardan's forces were defeated, with Vardan and most of the Armenian nobility dying in the fighting. The aftermath of the Battle of Avarayr is not completely clear, but it appears that Yazdegerd, alarmed by the Persian losses, withdrew his troops and imprisoned Vasak Siwni. Vardan's surviving supporters were imprisoned in Iran, although many of them were eventually released in the following years. In 481, a new rebellion manifested under the leadership of Vardan's nephew, Vahan Mamikonian, which succeeded in securing recognition of Armenian religious rights and autonomy with the Treaty of Nvarsak in 484.

Family 
Vardan Mamikonian was the father of Vardeni Mamikonian, known Shushanik, born around 439 AD. Shushanik married Varsken, a prominent Mihranid feudal lord (pitiakhsh). When Varsken took a pro-Persian position renouncing Christianity and adopting Zoroastrianism, he tried to force his wife Shushanik to convert as well, but she refused vehemently to submit and abandon her Christian faith, so she was put to death in AD 475 on her husband's orders. Shushanik has been canonized by the Georgian Orthodox and Apostolic Church and is venerated by the Armenian Apostolic Church. Known as Saint Shushanik, her feast day is celebrated on October 17.

Legacy

Consecration as saint

After his death, Vardan Mamikonian was consecrated as a saint of the Armenian Apostolic Church. He is also revered by the Armenian Catholic Church as a saint of the church and by Armenian Evangelical Church.

His commemoration day in the official Armenian Church calendar is usually in the month of February and on very rare occasions may fall in the first week of March. The actual feast day of Saint Vardan is a moving day, as it is on the last Thursday before Great Lent. Major Christian Armenian churches are named after Saint Vardan, including the St. Vartan Cathedral in New York City. There is also a St. Vartan Park right by the cathedral.

Knights of Vartan Inc. (USA)
The Armenian-American fraternal organization Knights of Vartan is named in honor of Vardan Mamikonian.

References

Bibliography 
 
 
 
 
 
 
 
 
 

387 births
451 deaths
Sparapets
Ancient Armenian generals
Armenian saints
5th-century Christian saints
Vardan
Rebellions against the Sasanian Empire
5th-century Armenian people
Military saints
Armenian people from the Sasanian Empire